Stephen Douglas Ross (born November 10, 1980) is a Canadian former professional basketball player.

Professional career
Ross signed with Donar (then known as GasTerra Flames after their sponsor) of the Dutch Basketball League (DBL) in 2009. He was a part of the league winning squad in 2010 and won the NBB Cup in 2011.

In the 2011–12 season, Ross played in Romania for SCM CSU Craiova. In the 2012–13 season he played for another Romanian club, U Mobitelco Cluj.

He signed with Belgian team Excelsior Brussels, that was preparing for its first Ethias League season in history for the 2013–14 season.

National team career 
Ross played for the Canada national team and played at the 2002 FIBA World Championship, held in Indianapolis. He played in three games, and scored 17 points in a classification round win against Lebanon.

Honours
Donar
Dutch Basketball League: (2010)
NBB Cup: (2011)

References
GeneralSpecific

External links
FIBA Profile

1980 births
Living people
2002 FIBA World Championship players
ASVEL Basket players
B.S. Leiden players
Basketball people from British Columbia
Brussels Basketball players
Canadian expatriate basketball people in the United States
Canadian men's basketball players
Donar (basketball club) players
Dutch Basketball League players
BSW (basketball club) players
San Diego Toreros men's basketball players
Santa Clara Broncos men's basketball players
Small forwards
Sportspeople from Kamloops